Yacoub Romanos (17 May 1935 – 24 August 2011) was a Lebanese wrestler. He competed in the men's Greco-Roman middleweight at the 1960 Summer Olympics.

References

1935 births
2011 deaths
Lebanese male sport wrestlers
Olympic wrestlers of Lebanon
Wrestlers at the 1960 Summer Olympics
People from Batroun District